Tehatta Assembly constituency is an assembly constituency in Nadia district in the Indian state of West Bengal.

Overview
As per orders of the Delimitation Commission, No. 78 Tehatta Assembly constituency  is composed of the following: Betai I, Betai II, Chhitka, Kanainagar, Natna, Patharghata I, Raghunathpur, Shyamnagar and Tehatta gram panchayats of Tehatta I community development block and  Dighal, Kandi, Nandanpur, Narayanpur I and Narayanpur II gram panchayats of Karimpur II CD Block.

Tehatta Assembly constituency is part of No. 12 Krishnanagar (Lok Sabha constituency).

Members of Legislative Assembly

The Tehatta assembly seat was not there between 1977 and 2006. Palashipara Assembly constituency and Chapra, West Bengal Assembly constituency existed in the area.

Election results

2021

2016
In the 2016 election, Gouri Sankar Dutta of Trinamool Congress defeated his nearest rival, Ranjit Kumar Mondal of Communist Party of India (Marxist).

2011
In the 2011 election, Ranjit Kumar Mondal of Communist Party of India (Marxist) defeated his nearest rival Tapas Kumar Saha, an Independent candidate.

 

Tapash Kumar Saha, contesting as an independent candidate, was a rebel Trinamool Congress candidate.

1977-2006
The Tehatta assembly seat was not there between 1977 and 2006. Palashipara Assembly constituency and Chapra, West Bengal Assembly constituency existed in the area.

1951–1972
Kartik Chandra Biswas of Congress won in 1972. Madhabendu Mohanta of CPI(M) won in 1971. Surat Ali Khan of Congress won in 1969. Shankardas Bandopadhyay of Congress won in 1967,1962 and 1957. In independent India's first election in 1951, Raghunandan Biswas of Congress won the Tehatta seat.

References

Assembly constituencies of West Bengal
Politics of Nadia district